There are at least 94 members of the order Solanales found in Montana.  Some of these species are exotics (not native to Montana) and some species have been designated as Species of Concern.

Buckbean
Family: Menyanthaceae
Menyanthes trifoliata, bog buckbean

Dodder
Family: Cuscutaceae

Cuscuta approximata, small-seed alfalfa dodder
Cuscuta coryli, hazel dodder
Cuscuta epithymum, clover dodder
Cuscuta gronovii, Gronovius dodder
Cuscuta indecora, pretty dodder
Cuscuta megalocarpa, big-fruit dodder
Cuscuta pentagona, field dodder

Morning-glory
Family: Convolvulaceae

Calystegia macounii, Macoun's bindweed
Calystegia sepium, hedge false bindweed
Convolvulus arvensis, field bindweed
Evolvulus nuttallianus, shaggy dwarf morning-glory
Ipomoea leptophylla, bush morning-glory

Phlox

Family: Polemoniaceae

Collomia debilis, alpine collomia
Collomia debilis var. camporum, alpine collomia
Collomia debilis var. debilis, alpine collomia
Collomia grandiflora, large-flower collomia
Collomia linearis, narrow-leaved collomia
Collomia tinctoria, yellow-staining collomia
Gilia leptomeria, great basin gilia
Gilia sinuata var. tweedyi, western polemonium
Gilia tenerrima, delicate gilia
Gilia tweedyi, Tweedy's gilia
Gymnosteris parvula, small-flower gymnosteris
Ipomopsis aggregata, scarlet skyrocket
Ipomopsis congesta, ball-head standing-cypress
Ipomopsis congesta subsp. congesta, ball-head standing-cypress
Ipomopsis congesta subsp. crebrifolia, ballhead gilia
Ipomopsis congesta subsp. pseudotypica, Wyoming ipomopsis
Ipomopsis minutiflora, small-flower standing-cypress
Ipomopsis pumila, dwarf ipomopsis
Ipomopsis spicata, spiked standing-cypress
Ipomopsis spicata subsp. orchidacea, orchid ipomopsis
Ipomopsis spicata subsp. spicata, spiked ipomopsis
Leptodactylon caespitosum, leptodactylon
Leptodactylon pungens, granite prickly-phlox
Linanthus nuttallii, Nuttall's linanthus
Linanthus septentrionalis, northern desert-gold
Microsteris gracilis, slender phlox
Navarretia divaricata, mountain navarretia
Navarretia intertexta, needle-leaf navarretia
Navarretia intertexta subsp. propinqua, near navarretia
Navarretia leucocephala, white-flower navarretia
Phlox albomarginata, mountain phlox
Phlox alyssifolia, alyssum-leaf phlox
Phlox andicola, Plains phlox
Phlox austromontana, desert mountain phlox
Phlox caespitosa, carpet phlox
Phlox diffusa, spreading phlox
Phlox hoodii, Hood's phlox
Phlox kelseyi, Kelsey's phlox
Phlox kelseyi subsp. kelseyi, Kelsey's phlox
Phlox kelseyi var. missoulensis, Missoula phlox
Phlox longifolia, longleaf phlox
Phlox multiflora, many-flowered phlox
Phlox muscoides, moss phlox
Phlox pulvinata, cushion phlox
Phlox speciosa, showy phlox
Polemonium micranthum, annual polemonium
Polemonium pulcherrimum, showy Jacob's-ladder
Polemonium viscosum, skunk polemonium

Potato 

Family: Solanaceae

Datura stramonium, jimsonweed
Hyoscyamus niger, black henbane
Lycium barbarum, common matrimony vine
Nicotiana attenuata, coyote tobacco
Physalis hederifolia, ivyleaf ground-cherry
Physalis heterophylla, clammy ground-cherry
Physalis longifolia, longleaf ground-cherry
Physalis pumila subsp. hispida, prairie ground-cherry
Solanum dulcamara, climbing nightshade
Solanum nigrum, black nightshade
Solanum physalifolium, ground-cherry nightshade
Solanum rostratum, buffalo bur
Solanum triflorum, cut-leaf nightshade

Waterleaf
Family: Hydrophyllaceae

Ellisia nyctelea, nyctelea
Hesperochiron californicus, California hesperochiron
Hesperochiron pumilus, dwarf hesperochiron
Hydrophyllum capitatum, dwarf waterleaf
Nama densum, nama
Nemophila breviflora, Great Basin nemophila
Phacelia bakeri, Baker's phacelia
Phacelia franklinii, Franklin's phacelia
Phacelia glandulosa, glandular scorpionweed
Phacelia hastata, silverleaf scorpion-weed
Phacelia heterophylla, virgate scorpion-weed
Phacelia incana, hoary phacelia
Phacelia ivesiana, Ives' phacelia
Phacelia ivesiana var. glandulifera, sticky scorpion-weed
Phacelia linearis, linearleaf phacelia
Phacelia lyallii, Lyall phacelia
Phacelia scopulina, dwarf phacelia
Phacelia sericea, silky scorpion-weed
Phacelia thermalis, hot spring phacelia
Romanzoffia sitchensis, Sitka mistmaid

Further reading

See also
 List of dicotyledons of Montana

Notes

Montana
Montana